Howard Levene (January 17, 1914 – July 2, 2003) was an American statistician and geneticist. He received his Ph.D. from Columbia University in 1947, and joined the faculty there shortly thereafter. He remained on the faculty at Columbia, where he served as professor of mathematical statistics and genetics, until 1982. He is known for developing Levene's test, a modified form of the one-way analysis of variance. He served as president of the American Society of Naturalists in 1976.

References

External links

1914 births
2003 deaths
American statisticians
American geneticists
Statistical geneticists
Columbia University faculty
New York University alumni
Columbia University alumni